Bastone is a surname. Notable people with the surname include:

William Bastone (born 1961), American journalist